The massacres of Poles in Volhynia and Eastern Galicia, were carried out in German-occupied Poland by the Ukrainian Insurgent Army, or the UPA, with the support of parts of the local Ukrainian population against the Polish minority in Volhynia, Eastern Galicia, parts of Polesia and Lublin region from 1943 to 1945. The peak of the massacres took place in July and August 1943. Most of the victims were women and children. Many of the Polish victims regardless of age or gender were tortured before being killed; some of the methods included rape, dismemberment or immolation, among others. The UPA's actions resulted in between 50,000 and 100,000 deaths.

The ethnic cleansing was an Ukrainian attempt to prevent the post-war Polish state from asserting its sovereignty over Ukrainian-majority areas that had been part of the prewar Polish state. The massacres led to a conflict between Polish resistance and Ukrainian insurgency in the German-occupied territories, with the Polish Home Army in Volhynia responding to the Ukrainian attacks, on a much smaller scale.

In 2008, the massacres which were committed by the Ukrainian nationalists against the Poles in Volhynia and Galicia were described by Poland's Institute of National Remembrance as bearing the distinct characteristics of a genocide, and on 22 July 2016, the Parliament of Poland passed a resolution recognizing the massacres as genocide. This classification is disputed by Ukraine and some non-Polish historians. According to a 2016 article in Slavic Review, there is a "scholarly consensus that this was a case of ethnic cleansing as opposed to genocide". Other victims of the massacres included several hundred Jews, Russians, Czechs, Georgians, and Ukrainians who were part of Polish families or opposed the UPA and sabotaged the massacres by hiding Polish escapees. Some Ukrainian religious authorities, institutions and leaders protested against the slayings of Polish civilians but without achieving much.

Background

Interwar period in Second Polish Republic

Just before the Soviet invasion of 1939, Volhynia had been part of the Second Polish Republic. According to the historian Timothy Snyder, between 1928 and 1938, Volhynia was "the site of one of eastern Europe's most ambitious policies of toleration". Through supporting Ukrainian culture, religious autonomy and the Ukrainization of the Orthodox Church, Józef Piłsudski and his allies wanted to achieve Ukrainian loyalty to the Polish state and to minimise Soviet influences in the borderline region. That approach was gradually abandoned after Piłsudski's death in 1935 as a consequence of an increase in radical Ukrainian nationalism.

In 1929, the Organization of Ukrainian Nationalists (OUN) was formed in Vienna, Austria, and was the result of a union between several radical nationalist and extreme right-wing organisations. Members of the organization carried out several acts of terror in Poland, which included the assassination of prominent Polish politicians, such as Interior Minister Bronisław Pieracki, and Polish and Ukrainian moderates, such as Tadeusz Hołówko.

The terror campaign and civil unrest in the Galician countryside resulted in Polish police exacting a policy of collective responsibility on local Ukrainians in an effort to "pacify" the region, demolishing Ukrainian community centers and libraries, confiscating property and produce, and beating protesters. Ukrainian parliamentarians were placed under house arrest to prevent them from participating in elections, with their constituents terrorized into voting for Polish candidates. The Ukrainian plight, protests and pacification received the attention of the League of Nations as 'an international cause célèbre', with Poland receiving condemnation from European politicians. The ongoing policies of Poland led to the deepening of ethnic cleavages in the area.

Volhynia was a place of increasingly violent conflict, with Polish police on one side and Western Ukrainian communists supported by many dissatisfied Ukrainian peasants on the other. The communists organized strikes, killed at least 31 suspected police informers in 1935–1936 and began to assassinate local Ukrainian officials for "collaboration" with the Polish state. The police conducted mass arrests, reported the killing of 18 communists in 1935, and killed at least 31 people in gunfights and during arrests over the course of 1936.

Beginning in 1937, the Polish government in Volhynia initiated an active campaign to use religion as a tool for Polonization and to convert the Orthodox population to Roman Catholicism. Over 190 Orthodox churches were destroyed and 150 converted to Roman Catholic churches. The remaining Orthodox churches were forced to use the Polish language in their sermons. In August 1939, the last remaining Orthodox church in the Volhynian capital of Lutsk was converted to a Roman Catholic church by a decree of the Polish government.

Between 1921 and 1938, thousands of Polish colonists and war veterans were encouraged to settle in the Volhynian and Galician countrysides, adding to the already-significant Polish, Jewish, German and Armenian urban populations in both regions whose presence in the lands had dated to the 14th century. The new settlements were constructed in areas lacking infrastructure, such as buildings, roads and rail connections. In spite of the great difficulties, their number reached 17,700 in Volhynia in 3,500 new settlements by 1939. According to the Polish census of 1931, in Eastern Galicia, the Ukrainian language was spoken by 52% of the inhabitants, Polish by 40% and Yiddish by 7%, In Wołyn (Volhynia), the Ukrainian language was spoken by 68% of the inhabitants, Polish by 17%, Yiddish by 10%, German by 2%, Czech by 2% and Russian by 1%. The additional presence of the newly arrived settlers ignited further anti-Polish sentiment among local Ukrainians.

Harsh policies implemented by the Second Polish Republic were often a response to OUN-B violence but contributed to a further deterioration of relations between the two ethnic groups. Between 1934 and 1938, a series of violent and sometimes-deadly attacks against Ukrainians were conducted in other parts of Poland.

Also in Wołyń Voivodeship, some of the new policies were implemented, resulting in the suppression of the Ukrainian language, culture and religion, and the antagonism escalated. Although around 68% of the voivodeship's population spoke Ukrainian as their first language (see table), practically all government and administrative positions, including the police, were assigned to Poles.

Jeffrey Burds of Northeastern University believes that the buildup towards the ethnic cleansing of Poles, which erupted during the Second World War in Galicia and Volhynia, had its roots in that period.

The Ukrainian population was outraged by the Polish government policies. A Polish report on the popular mood in Volhynia recorded a comment of a young Ukrainian from October 1938: "we will decorate our pillars with you and our trees with your wives".

By the beginning of the Second World War, the membership of OUN had risen to 20,000 active members, and the number of supporters was many times as many.

Second World War

In September 1939, at the outbreak of World War II and in accordance with the secret protocol of the Molotov–Ribbentrop Pact, Poland was invaded from the west by Nazi Germany and from the east by the Soviet Union. Volhynia was split by the Soviets into two oblasts, Rovno and Volyn, in the Ukrainian SSR. Upon the annexation, the Soviet NKVD started to eliminate the predominantly Polish middle and upper classes, including social activists and military leaders. Between 1939 and 1941, 200,000 Poles were deported to Siberia by the Soviet authorities. Many Polish prisoners-of-war were deported to East Ukraine, where most of them were executed in basements of the Kharkiv NKVD offices. Estimates of the number of Polish citizens transferred to the Soviet Union, such as Eastern Europe, the Urals and Siberia, range from 1.2 to 1.7 million. Tens of thousands of Poles fled from the Soviet-occupied zone to areas that were controlled by the Germans. The deportations and murders deprived the Poles of their community leaders.

During the Soviet occupation, Polish members of the local administration were replaced by Ukrainians and Jews, and the Soviet NKVD subverted the Ukrainian independence movement. All local Ukrainian political parties were abolished. Between 20,000 and 30,000 Ukrainian activists fled to German-occupied territory; most of those who did not escape were arrested. For example, Dmytro Levitsky, the head of the moderate left-leaning democratic party Ukrainian National Democratic Alliance and the chief of the Ukrainian delegation in the prewar Polish parliament, with many of his colleagues, were arrested, deported to Moscow, and never heard from again. The elimination by the Soviets of the individuals, organizations, and parties representing moderate or liberal political tendencies within Ukrainian society allowed the extremist Organization of Ukrainian Nationalists, which operated in the underground, to be the only political party with a significant organizational presence among western Ukrainians.

On 22 June 1941, the territories of eastern Poland which were occupied by the Soviet Union were attacked by German, Slovak and Hungarian forces. In Volhynia, the Red Army was only able to resist the attack for a couple of days. On 30 June 1941, the Soviets withdrew eastward and Volhynia was overrun by the Germans, with support from Ukrainian nationalists, who carried out acts of sabotage. The OUN organized the Ukrainian People's Militia, which staged pogroms and helped the Germans round up and execute Poles, Jews and those who were deemed to be communist or Soviet activists, most notably in Lwów, Stanisławów, Korosten and Sokal.

In 1941, two brothers of the Ukrainian leader Stepan Bandera were murdered, while they were imprisoned in Auschwitz, by Volksdeutsche kapos. In the Chełm region, 394 Ukrainian community leaders were killed by the Poles on the grounds of collaboration with the German authorities.

During the first year of the German occupation, the OUN urged its members to join German police units. They were trained in the use of weapons so they could assist the German SS in the murder of approximately 200,000 Volhynian Jews. While the Ukrainian police's share in the actual killings of Jews was small because it primarily played a supporting role, the Ukrainian police learned how to make use of genocidal techniques from the Germans: detailed and advanced planning and careful site selection, giving phony assurances to local populations prior to their annihilation, and sudden encirclement and mass killing. The training which the UPA received in 1942 explains how it was able to efficiently kill Poles in 1943.

Massacres

Planning
The decisions leading to the massacre of Poles in Volhynia and their implementation can be primarily attributed to the extremist Bandera faction of OUN (OUN-B), not to other Ukrainian political or military groups. The OUN-B had an ideology involving the following ideas: integral nationalism, with a pure national state and language being desired goals; glorification of violence and armed struggle of nation versus nation; and totalitarianism in which the nation must be ruled by one person and one political party. While the moderate Melnyk faction of OUN admired aspects of Mussolini's fascism, the more extreme Bandera faction of OUN admired aspects of Nazism.

At the time of OUN's founding, the most popular political party among Ukrainians was the Ukrainian National Democratic Alliance, which was opposed to Polish rule but called for peaceful and democratic means to achieve independence from Poland. The OUN, on the other hand, was originally a fringe movement in western Ukraine and was condemned for its violence by figures from mainstream Ukrainian society such as the head of the Ukrainian Greek Catholic Church, Metropolitan Andriy Sheptytsky, who wrote of the OUN's leadership that "whoever demoralizes our youth is a criminal and an enemy of our people". Several factors contributed to OUN-B's increase in popularity and ultimately monopoly of power within Ukrainian society, conditions that were necessary for the massacres to occur.

Only one group of Ukrainian nationalists, OUN-B under Mykola Lebed and then Roman Shukhevych, intended the ethnic cleansing of Volhynia. Taras Bulba-Borovets, the founder of the Ukrainian People's Revolutionary Army, rejected the idea and condemned the anti-Polish massacres when they started. The OUN-M leadership did not believe that such an operation was advantageous in 1943.

After Hitler's attack on the Soviet Union, both the Polish government-in-exile and the Ukrainian OUN-B considered the possibility that in the event of mutually exhaustive attrition warfare between Germany and the Soviet Union, the region would become a scene of conflict between Poles and Ukrainians. The Polish government-in-exile, which wanted the region to return to Poland, planned for a swift armed takeover of the territory, as part of its overall plan for a future anti-German uprising. That view was compounded by OUN's prior collaboration with the Nazis and so by 1943, no understanding between the Polish Home Army and the OUN was possible.

In Eastern Galicia, the antagonism between Poles and Ukrainians intensified under the German occupation. Having perceived Ukrainian collaboration with the Soviet government in 1939–1941 and then with the Germans, the local Poles generally thought that Ukrainians ought to be removed from the territories. In July 1942 a memorandum by the staff of the Home Army in Lviv in July 1942 recommended that between 1 million and 1.5 million Ukrainians to be deported from Galicia and Volhynia to the Soviet Union and the rest scattered throughout Poland.  Suggestions of limited Ukrainian autonomy, as was being discussed by the Home Army in Warsaw and the Polish government-in-exile in London, found no support among the local Poles. In early 1943, the Polish underground came to contemplate the possibility of rapprochement with Ukrainians, which proved fruitless since neither side was willing to sacrifice its claim to Lviv.

Even before the war, the OUN adhered to concepts of integral nationalism in its totalitarian form according to which Ukrainian statehood required ethnic homogeneity, and the Polish enemy could be defeated only by the elimination of Poles from Ukrainian territories. From the OUN-B perspective, the Jews had already been annihilated, and the Russians and Germans were only temporarily in Ukraine, but Poles had to be forcefully removed. The OUN-B came to believe that it had to move fast while the Germans still controlled the area in order to pre-empt future Polish efforts to re-establish Poland's prewar borders. The result was that the local OUN-B commanders in Volhynia and Galicia, if not the OUN-B leadership itself, decided that ethnic cleansing of Poles from the area through terror and murder to be necessary.

As evidenced by both Polish and Ukrainian underground reports, the only major concern of Ukrainian nationalists was initially that of strong Soviet partisan groups operating in the area. The groups consisted mostly of Soviet POWs and initially specialized in raiding local settlements, which disturbed both the OUN and local Polish self-defence units, which expected the result to be an increase in the German terror. The concerns soon materialized, as Germans began "pacifying" entire villages in Volhynia in retaliation for real or alleged support for the Soviet partisans. Polish historiography attributed most of the actions to Ukrainian nationalists, but they were really conducted by Ukrainian auxiliary police units under the direct supervision of Germans. One of the best-known examples was the pacification of Obórki, a village in Lutsk County, on 13–14 November 1942. Most actions were carried out by the Ukrainian occupational police, but the murder of 53 Polish villagers was perpetrated personally by the Germans, who supervised the operation.

For many months in 1942, the OUN-B was not able to control the situation in Volhynia, where, in addition to Soviet partisans, many independent Ukrainian self-defense groups started to form in response to the growth of the German terror. The first OUN-B military groups were created in Volhynia in autumn 1942, with a goal of subduing the other independent groups. By February 1943, the OUN had initiated a policy of murdering civilian Poles as a way of resolving the Polish question in Ukraine. In spring 1943, OUN-B partisans started to call themselves the Ukrainian Insurgent Army (UPA) and to use the former name of the Ukrainian People's Revolutionary Army, another Ukrainian group operating in the area in 1942. In March 1943, approximately 5,000 Ukrainian policemen defected with their weapons and joined the UPA. Well-trained and well-armed, the group contributed to the UPA achieving dominance over other Ukrainian groups active in Volhynia. Soon, the newly created OUN-B forces managed to destroy or to absorb other Ukrainian groups in Volhynia, including four OUN-M units and the Ukrainian People's Revolutionary Army. According to Timothy Snyder, along the way Bandera-faction partisans killed tens of thousands of Ukrainians for supposed links to Melnyk or Bulba-Borovets. The OUN-B undertook steps to liquidate "foreign elements", with posters and leaflets urging Ukrainians to murder Poles. Its dominance secured in spring 1943, the UPA having gained control over the Volhynian countryside from the Germans, the UPA began large-scale operations against the Polish population.

Volhynia

Between 1939 and 1943, Volhynian Poles had been already reduced to some 8% of the region's population (around 200,000 people).  They were dispersed around the countryside and deprived of their elites by Soviet deportations, with no local partisan army of their own or state authority (except the Germans) to protect them.

On 9 February 1943, a UPA group, commanded by Hryhory Perehyniak, pretended to be Soviet partisans and assaulted the Parośle settlement in Sarny County. It is considered a prelude to the massacres and is recognized as the first mass murder committed by the UPA in the area. Estimates of the number of victims range from 149 to 173.

In 1943, the massacres were organized westward and started in March in Kostopol and Sarny Counties. In April, they moved to the area of Krzemieniec, Rivne, Dubno and Lutsk. The UPA killed approximately 7,000 unarmed men, women and children in late March and early April 1943.

On the night of 22–23 April, Ukrainian groups commanded by Ivan Lytwynchuk (a.k.a. Dubovy) attacked the settlement of Janowa Dolina, killing 600 people and burning down the entire village. The few who survived were mostly people who had found refuge with friendly Ukrainian families. In one of the massacres, in the village of Lipniki, almost the entire family of Mirosław Hermaszewski, Poland's only cosmonaut, was murdered along with about 180 inhabitants. The attackers murdered the grandparents of the composer Krzesimir Dębski, whose parents were engaged during the Ukrainian attack on Kisielin. Dębski's parents survived by taking refuge with a friendly Ukrainian family.

In another massacre, according to the UPA reports, the Polish colonies of Kuty, in the Szumski region, and Nowa Nowica, in the Webski region, were liquidated for co-operation with the Gestapo and the other German authorities. According to Polish sources, the Kuty self-defense unit managed to repel a UPA assault, but at least 53 Poles were murdered. The rest of the inhabitants decided to abandon the village and were escorted by the Germans who arrived at Kuty, alerted by the glow of fire and the sound of gunfire. Maksym Skorupskyi, one of the UPA commanders, wrote in his diary: "Starting from our action on Kuty, day by day after sunset, the sky was bathing in the glow of conflagration. Polish villages were burning".

By June 1943, the attacks had spread to Kowel, Włodzimierz Wołyński and Horochów Counties and in August to Luboml County. The Soviet victory at Kursk acted as a stimulus for the escalation of massacres in June and August 1943, when the ethnic cleansing reached its peak. In June 1943, Dmytro Klyachkivsky, head-commander of the UPA-North, issued a secret directive saying: 
We should make a large action of the liquidation of the Polish element. As the German armies withdraw, we should take advantage of this convenient moment for liquidating the entire male population in the age from 16 up to 60 years. We cannot lose this fight, and it is necessary at all costs to weaken Polish forces. Villages and settlements lying next to the massive forests, should disappear from the face of the earth.Władysław Filar, Wydarzenia wołyńskie 1939–1944. Wydawnictwo Adam Marszałek. Toruń 2008 , Antypolskie akcje nacjonalistów ukraińskich from Przed Akcją Wisła był Wołyń, Warsaw, 1997

However, most of the victims were women and children. In mid-1943, after a wave of killings of Polish civilians, the Poles tried to initiate negotiations with the UPA. Two delegates of the Polish government-in-exile and the Home Army, Zygmunt Rumel and Krzysztof Markiewicz, attempted to negotiate with the UPA leaders, but they were captured and murdered on July 10, 1943 in the village of Kustycze. Some sources claim that they were tortured before their death.

The following day, 11 July 1943, is regarded as the bloodiest day of the massacres, with many reports of UPA units marching from village to village and killing Polish civilians. On that day, UPA units surrounded and attacked Polish villages and settlements located in three counties: Kowel, Horochow, and Włodzimierz Wołyński. Events began at 3:00 am, leaving the Poles with little chance to escape. After the massacres, the Polish villages were burned to the ground. According to those few who survived, the action had been carefully prepared; a few days before the massacres, there had been several meetings in Ukrainian villages during which UPA members told the villagers that the slaughter of all Poles was necessary. Altogether, on July 11, 1943, the Ukrainians attacked 167 towns and villages. Within a few days, an unspecified number of Polish villages were completely destroyed and their populations murdered. In the Polish village of Gurow, out of 480 inhabitants, only 70 survived; in the settlement of Orzeszyn, the UPA killed 306 out of 340 Poles; in the village of Sadowa out of 600 Polish inhabitants, only 20 survived; in Zagaje out of 350 Poles, only a few survived. The wave of massacres lasted five days until July 16. The UPA continued the ethnic cleansing, particularly in rural areas, until most Poles had been deported, killed or expelled. The thoroughly-planned actions were conducted by many units and were well-coordinated.

In August 1943, the Polish village of Gaj, near Kovel, was burned and some 600 people were massacred, in the village of Wola Ostrowiecka 529 people were killed, including 220 children under 14, and 438 people were killed, including 246 children, in Ostrowki. In September 1992, exhumations were carried out in those villages and confirmed the number of dead.

The same month, the UPA placed notices in every Polish village: "in 48 hours leave beyond the Bug River or the San river- otherwise Death". Ukrainian attackers limited their actions to villages and settlements and did not strike towns or cities.

The killings were opposed by the Ukrainian Central Committee under Volodymyr Kubiyovych. In response, UPA units murdered Ukrainian Central Committee representatives and a Ukrainian Catholic priest who had read an appeal by the Ukrainian Central Committee from his pulpit.

The Polish historian Władysław Filar, who witnessed the massacres, cites numerous statements made by Ukrainian officers when they reported their actions to the leaders of the UPA-OUN. For example, in late September 1943, the commandant "Lysyi" wrote to the OUN headquarters: "On 29 September 1943, I carried out the action in the villages of Wola Ostrowiecka (see Massacre of Wola Ostrowiecka), and Ostrivky (see Massacre of Ostrówki). I have liquidated all Poles, starting from the youngest ones. Afterwards, all buildings were burned and all goods were confiscated". On that day in Wola Ostrowiecka, 529 Poles were murdered (including 220 children under 14), and in Ostrówki, the Ukrainians killed 438 people (including 246 children).

Eastern Galicia

In late 1943 and early 1944, after most Poles in Volhynia had either been murdered or had fled the area, the conflict spread to the neighboring province of Galicia, where most of the population was still Ukrainian, but the Polish presence was strong. Unlike in the case of Volhynia, where Polish villages were usually destroyed and their inhabitants murdered without warning, in eastern Galicia, Poles were sometimes given the choice of fleeing or being killed. An order by a UPA commander in Galicia stated, "Once more I remind you: first call upon Poles to abandon their land and only later liquidate them, not the other way around"). The change in tactics, combined with better Polish self-defense and a demographic balance more favorable to Poles, resulted in a significantly lower death toll among Poles in Galicia than in Volhynia. The methods used by Ukrainian nationalists in this area were the same: rounding up and killing all the Polish residents of the villages and then looting the villages and burning them to the ground. On 28 February 1944, in the village of Korosciatyn 135 Poles were murdered; the victims were later counted by a local Roman Catholic priest, Mieczysław Kamiński. Jan Zaleski (father of Tadeusz Isakowicz-Zaleski) who witnessed the massacre, wrote in his diary: "The slaughter lasted almost all night. We heard terrible cries, the roar of cattle burning alive, shooting. It seemed that Antichrist himself began his activity!" Kamiński claimed that in Koropiec, where no Poles were actually murdered, a local Greek Catholic priest, in reference to mixed Polish-Ukrainian families, proclaimed from the pulpit: "Mother, you're suckling an enemy – strangle it." Among the scores of Polish villages whose inhabitants were murdered and all buildings burned are places like Berezowica, near Zbaraz; Ihrowica, near Ternopil; Plotych, near Ternopil; Podkamien, near Brody; and Hanachiv and Hanachivka, near Przemyślany.

Roman Shukhevych, a UPA commander, stated in his order from 25 February 1944: "In view of the success of the Soviet forces it is necessary to speed up the liquidation of the Poles, they must be totally wiped out, their villages burned... only the Polish population must be destroyed".

One of the most infamous massacres took place on 28 February 1944 in the Polish village of Huta Pieniacka, with over 1,000 inhabitants. The village had served as a shelter for refugees including Polish Jews as well as a recuperation base for Polish and communist partisans. One AK unit was active there. In the winter of 1944, a Soviet partisan unit numbering 1,000 was stationed in the village for two weeks. Huta Pieniacka's villagers, although poor, organized a well-fortified and armed self-defense unit, which fought off a Ukrainian and German reconnaissance attack on 23 February 1944.  Two soldiers of the 14th Waffen Grenadier Division of the SS Galicia (1st Ukrainian) Division of the Waffen-SS were killed and one wounded by the villagers. On February 28, elements of the Ukrainian 14th SS Division from Brody returned with 500–600 men, assisted by a group of civilian nationalists. The killing spree lasted all day. Kazimierz Wojciechowski, the commander of the Polish self-defense unit, was drenched with gasoline and burned alive at the main square. The village was utterly destroyed and all of its occupants killed. The civilians, mostly women and children, were rounded up at a church, divided and locked into barns, which were set on fire. Estimates of casualties in the Huta Pieniacka massacre vary and include 500 (Ukrainian archives), over 1,000 (Tadeusz Piotrowski),  and 1,200 (Sol Littman). According to IPN investigation, the crime was committed by the 4th battalion of the Ukrainian 14th SS Division supported by UPA units and local Ukrainian civilians.

A military journal of the Ukrainian 14th SS Division condemned the killing of Poles. In a 2 March 1944 article addressed to the Ukrainian youth, which was written by military leaders, Soviet partisans were blamed for the murders of Poles and Ukrainians, and the authors stated, "If God forbid, among those who committed such inhuman acts, a Ukrainian hand was found, it will be forever excluded from the Ukrainian national community". Some historians deny the role of the Ukrainian 14th SS Division in the killings and attribute them entirely to German units, but others disagree. According to Yale historian Timothy Snyder, the Ukrainian 14th SS Division's role in the ethnic cleansing of Poles from western Ukraine was marginal.

The village of Pidkamin (Podkamień), near Brody, was a shelter for Poles, who hid in the monastery of the Dominicans there. Some 2,000 persons, mostly women and children, were living there when the monastery was attacked in mid-March 1944 by the UPA units, which Polish Home Army accounts accused of co-operating with the Ukrainian SS. Over 250 Poles were killed. In the nearby village of Palikrovy, 300 Poles were killed, 20 in Maliniska and 16 in Chernytsia. Armed Ukrainian groups destroyed the monastery and stole all valuables. What remained was the painting of Mary of Pidkamin, which now is kept in St. Wojciech Church in Wrocław. According to Kirichuk, the first attacks on the Poles took place there in August 1943 and were probably the work of the UPA units from Volhynia. In retaliation, Poles killed important Ukrainians, including a Ukrainian doctor from Lviv, called Lastowiecky and a popular football player from Przemyśl, called Wowczyszyn.

By the end of the summer, mass acts of terror aimed at Poles were taking place in Eastern Galicia to force Poles to settle on the western bank of the San River under the slogan "Poles behind the San". Snyder estimates that 25,000 Poles were killed in Galicia alone, and Grzegorz Motyka estimated the number of victims at 30,000–40,000.

The slaughter did not stop after the Red Army entered the areas, with massacres taking place in 1945 in such places as Czerwonogrod (Ukrainian: Irkiv), where 60 Poles were murdered on February 2, 1945, the day before they were scheduled to depart for the Recovered Territories.

By Autumn 1944, anti-Polish actions stopped, and terror was used only against those who co-operated with the NKVD, but in late 1944-early 1945, the UPA performed a last massive anti-Polish action in Ternopil region. On the night of 5–6 February 1945, Ukrainian groups attacked the Polish village of Barysz, near Buchach; 126 Poles were massacred, including women and children. A few days later, on 12–13 February, a local group of OUN under Petro Khamchuk attacked the Polish settlement of Puźniki, killed around 100 people and burned houses. Most of those who survived moved to Niemysłowice near Prudnik, Silesia.

Approximately 150–366 Ukrainian and a few Polish inhabitants of Pawłokoma were killed on 3 March 1945 by a former Polish Home Army unit, aided by Polish self-defense groups from nearby villages. The massacre is believed to be an act of retaliation for earlier alleged murders by Ukrainian Insurgent Army of 9 or 11 Poles in Pawłokoma and unspecified number of Poles killed by the UPA in the neighboring villages.

Atrocities
Attacks on Poles during the massacres in Volhynia and Eastern Galicia were marked with extreme sadism and brutality. Rape, torture and mutilation were commonplace. Poles were burned alive, flayed, impaled, crucified, disembowelled, dismembered and beheaded. Women were gang raped and had their breasts sliced off, children were hacked to pieces with axes, babies were impaled on bayonets and pitchforks or bashed against trees.

The atrocities were carried out indiscriminately and without restraint. The victims, regardless of their age or gender, were routinely tortured to death. Norman Davies in No Simple Victory gives a short but shocking description of the massacres:

An OUN order from early 1944 stated: 
 UPA commander's order of 6 April 1944 stated: "Fight them [the Poles] unmercifully. No one is to be spared, even in case of mixed marriages".

Timothy Snyder describes the murders: "Ukrainian partisans burned homes, shot or forced back inside those who tried to flee, and used sickles and pitchforks to kill those they captured outside. In some cases, beheaded, crucified, dismembered, or disemboweled bodies were displayed, in order to encourage remaining Poles to flee". A similar account has been presented by Niall Ferguson, who wrote: "Whole villages were wiped out, men beaten to death, women raped and mutilated, babies bayoneted". The Ukrainian historian Yuryi Kirichuk described the conflict as similar to medieval peasant uprisings.

According to the Polish historian Piotr Łossowski, the method used in most of the attacks was the same. At first, local Poles were assured that nothing would happen to them. Then, at dawn, a village was surrounded by armed members of the UPA, behind whom were peasants with axes, knives, hatchets, hammers, pitchforks, shovels, sickles, scythes, hoes and various other farming tools. All of the Poles who were encountered were murdered; most were killed in their homes but sometimes they were herded into churches or barns which were then set on fire. Many Poles were thrown down wells or killed and then buried in shallow mass graves as well. After a massacre, all goods were looted, including clothes, grain and furniture. The final part of an attack was setting fire to the entire village. All vestiges of Polish existence were eradicated, even abandoned Polish settlements were burned to the ground.

Even though it may be an exaggeration to say that the massacres enjoyed the general support of the Ukrainians, it has been suggested that without wide support from local Ukrainians, they would have been impossible. The Ukrainian peasants who took part in the killings created their own groups, the SKV or Samoboronni Kushtchovi Viddily (Самооборонні Кущові Відділи, СКВ). Many of their victims who were perceived as Poles, even despite not knowing the Polish language, were murdered by СКВ along with the others.

The violence reached its peak on 11 July 1943 known to many Poles as “Bloody Sunday” when the UPA carried out attacks on 100 Polish villages in Volhynia burning them to the ground and slaughtering some 8,000 Polish men, women and children including patients and nurses at a hospital. These attacks as well as others could have been stopped at anytime by the Germans who in some cases were stationed in garrisons in or near the villages that were attacked. German soldiers however were given orders not to intervene. In some cases individual German soldiers and officers made deals with the UPA to give weapons and other materials to them in exchange for a share of the loot taken from Poles.

Ukrainians in ethnically-mixed settlements were offered material incentives to join in the slaughter of their neighbors or warned by the UPA's security service (Sluzhba Bezbeky) to flee by night, and all remaining inhabitants were murdered at dawn. Many Ukrainians risked and in some cases lost their lives for trying to shelter or warn Poles. Such activities were treated by the UPA as collaboration with the enemy and severely punished. In 2007, the Polish Institute of National Remembrance (IPN) published a document, Kresowa Księga Sprawiedliwych 1939 – 1945. O Ukraińcach ratujących Polaków poddanych eksterminacji przez OUN i UPA ("Borderland's Book of the Righteous. About Ukrainians saving Poles from extermination of OUN and UIA"). The author of the book, IPN's historian Romuald Niedzielko, documented 1341 cases in which Ukrainian civilians helped their Polish neighbours, which caused 384 Ukrainians to be executed by the UPA.

In Polish-Ukrainian families, one common UPA instruction was to kill one's Polish spouse and children born of that marriage. People who refused to carry such an order were often murdered, together with their entire family.

According to Ukrainian sources, in October 1943 the Volhynian delegation of the Polish government estimated the number of Polish casualties in Sarny, Kostopol, Równe and Zdołbunów counties to exceed 15,000. Timothy Snyder estimates that in July 1943, the UPA actions resulted in the deaths of at least 40,000 Polish civilians in Volhynia (in March 1944, another 10,000 were killed in Galicia), causing additional 200,000 Poles to flee west before September 1944 and 800,000 afterward.

Self-defence organizations
The massacres prompted Poles in April 1943 to begin to organize in self-defence, 100 of such organizations being formed in Volhynia in 1943. Sometimes, self-defence organizations obtained arms from the Germans, but other times, the Germans confiscated their weapons and arrested the leaders. Many of the organizations could not withstand the pressure of the UPA and were destroyed. Only the largest self-defense organizations, which were able to obtain help from the Home Army or Soviet partisans, were able to survive. Kazimierz Bąbiński, commander of the Union for Armed Struggle-Home Army Wołyń in his order to AK partisan units stated:

The Home Army on 20 July 1943 called upon Polish self-defense units to place themselves under its command. Ten days later, it declared itself for Ukrainian independence on territories without Polish populations, and it called for an end to the killings of civilians.

Polish self-defence organizations started to take part in revenge massacres of Ukrainian civilians in the summer of 1943, when Ukrainian villagers who had nothing to do with the massacres suffered at the hands of Polish partisan forces. Evidence includes a letter dated 26 August 1943 to the local Polish self-defence in which the AK commander Kazimierz Bąbiński criticized the burning of neighboring Ukrainian villages, the killing of any Ukrainian who crossed its path and the robbing of Ukrainians of their material possessions. The total number of Ukrainian civilians murdered in Volyn in retaliatory acts by Poles is estimated at 2,000–3,000.

The 27th Home Army Infantry Division was formed in January 1944 and tasked to fight the UPA and then the Wehrmacht.

German involvement
While Germans actively encouraged the conflict, they tried not to get directly involved. Special German units formed from the collaborationist Ukrainian and later the Polish auxiliary police were deployed in pacification actions in Volhynia, and some of their crimes were attributed to the Home Army or to the UPA.

According to Yuriy Kirichuk the Germans actively prodded both sides of the conflict against each other. Erich Koch once said: "We have to do everything possible so that a Pole meeting a Ukrainian, would be willing to kill him and conversely, a Ukrainian would be willing to kill a Pole". Kirichuk quotes a German commissioner from Sarny who responded to the Polish complaints: "You want Sikorski, the Ukrainians want Bandera. Fight each other".

The Germans replaced Ukrainian policemen who deserted from the German service with Polish policemen. Polish motives for joining were local and personal: to defend themselves or avenge UPA atrocities. German policy called for the murder of the family of every Ukrainian police officer who deserted and the destruction of the village of any Ukrainian police officer who deserted with his weapons. Those retaliations were carried out using newly recruited Polish policemen. Polish participation in the German police followed UPA attacks on Polish settlements, but it provided Ukrainian nationalists with useful sources of propaganda and was used as a justification for the cleansing action. The OUN-B leader summarized the situation in August 1943 by saying that the German administration "uses Polaks in its destructive actions. In response we destroy them unmercifully". Despite the desertions in March and April 1943, the auxiliary police remained heavily Ukrainian, and Ukrainians serving the Germans continued pacifications of Polish and other villages.

On 25 August 1943, the German authorities ordered all Poles to leave the villages and settlements and to move to larger towns.

Soviet partisan units in the area were aware of the massacres. On 25 May 1943, the commander of the Soviet partisan forces of the Rivne area stressed in his report to the headquarters that Ukrainian nationalists did not shoot the Poles but cut them dead with knives and axes, with no consideration for age or gender.

Number of victims
According to historian George Liber,

Polish casualties
The death toll among civilians murdered during the Volhynia Massacre is still being researched. At least 10% of ethnic Poles in Volhynia were killed by the UPA. Accordingly, "Polish casualties comprised about 1% of the prewar population of Poles on territories where the UPA was active and 0.2% of the entire ethnically Polish population in Ukraine and Poland". Łossowski emphasizes that documentation is far from conclusive, as in numerous cases, no survivors were later able to testify.

The Soviet and German invasions of prewar eastern Poland, the UPA massacres, and the postwar Soviet expulsions of Poles contributed to the virtual elimination of a Polish presence in the region. Those who remained left Volhynia, mostly for the neighbouring province of Lublin. After the war, the survivors moved further west to the territories of Lower Silesia. Polish orphans from Volhynia were kept in several orphanages, with the largest of them around Kraków. Several former Polish villages in Volhynia and Eastern Galicia no longer exist, and those that remain are in ruins.

The Institute of National Remembrance estimates that 100,000 Poles were killed by the Ukrainian nationalists (40,000–60,000 victims in Volhynia, 30,000–40,000 in Eastern Galicia and at least 4,000 in Lesser Poland, including up to 2,000 in the Chełm region). For Eastern Galicia, other estimates range between 20,000 and 25,000, 25,000 and 30,000–40,000. Niall Ferguson estimated the total number of Polish victims in Volhynia and Eastern Galicia to be between 60,000 and 80,000, G. Rossolinski-Liebe: 70,000–100,000, John P. Himka: 100,000. According to Motyka, from 1943 to 1945 in all territories covered by the conflict, approximately 100,000 Poles were killed. According to Ivan Katchanovski, a Ukrainian political scientist, between 35,000 and 60,000; "the lower bound of these estimates [35,000] is more reliable than higher estimates which are based on an assumption that the Polish population in the region was several times less likely to perish as a result of Nazi genocidal policies compared to other regions of Poland and compared to the Ukrainian population of Volhynia". Władysław Siemaszko and his daughter Ewa have documented 33,454 Polish victims, 18,208 of whom are known by surname. (in July 2010, Ewa increased the accounts to 38,600 documented victims, 22,113 of whom are known by surname). At the first-ever joint Polish-Ukrainian conference in Podkowa Leśna, organized on June 7–9, 1994 by Karta Centre, and subsequent Polish-Ukrainian historian meetings, with almost 50 Polish and Ukrainian participants, an estimate of 50,000 Polish deaths in Volhynia was settled on, which they considered to be moderate. According to the sociologist Piotrowski, the UPA actions resulted in an estimated number of 68,700 deaths in Wołyń Voivodeship. Per Anders Rudling states that the UPA killed 40,000–70,000 Poles in the area. Some extreme estimates place the number of Polish victims as high as 300,000. Also, the numbers include Polonized Armenians killed in the massacres, such as in Kuty. The studies from 2011 quote 91,200 confirmed deaths, 43,987 of which are known by name.

Ukrainian casualties
After the initiation of the massacres, Polish self-defense units responded in kind. All conflicts resulted in Poles taking revenge on Ukrainian civilians. A. Rudling estimates Ukrainian casualties which were caused by Polish retribution at 2,000–3,000 in Volhynia. G. Rossolinski-Liebe puts the number of Ukrainians, both OUN-UPA members and civilians, killed by Poles during and after World War II to be 10,000–20,000. According to Kataryna Wolczuk, for all of the areas affected by conflict, the Ukrainian casualties range from 10,000 to 30,000 between 1943 and 1947. According to Motyka, the author of a fundamental monograph about the UPA, estimations of 30,000 Ukrainian casualties are unsupported; his estimates are 2,000–3,000 Ukrainians killed in Volhynia and 10,000–15,000 in all of the territories covered by the conflict in 1943–1947. He states that most of the Ukrainian casualties occurred within the post-war Polish borders (8,000–10,000, including 5,000–6,000 Ukrainians killed in 1944–1947).

The historian Timothy Snyder considers it likely that the UPA killed as many Ukrainians as it killed Poles, because local Ukrainians who did not adhere to its form of nationalism were considered traitors.

Estimates

Responsibility
The Organization of Ukrainian Nationalists (OUN), of which the Ukrainian Insurgent Army had become the armed wing, promoted the removal, by force if necessary, of non-Ukrainians from the social and economic spheres of a future Ukrainian state.

The Organization of Ukrainian Nationalists adopted in 1929 the Ten Commandments of the Ukrainian Nationalists to which all of its members were expected to adhere. They stated, "Do not hesitate to carry out the most dangerous deeds" and "Treat the enemies of your nation with hatred and ruthlessness".

The decision of ethnic cleansing of the area east of the Bug River was taken by the Ukrainian Insurgent Army early in 1943. In March 1943, the OUN(B) (specifically Mykola Lebed) imposed a collective death sentence of all Poles living in the former east of the Second Polish Republic, and a few months later, local units of the UPA were instructed to complete the operation soon. The decision to eliminate the territory's Poles determined the course of future events. According to Timothy Snyder, the ethnic cleansing of the Poles was exclusively the work of the extremist Bandera faction of the OUN, rather than its Melnyk faction or other Ukrainian political or religious organizations. Polish investigators claim that the OUN-B central leadership decided in February 1943 to drive all Poles out of Volhynia to obtain an "ethnically pure territory" in the postwar period. Among those who were behind the decision, Polish investigators singled out Dmytro Klyachkivsky, Vasyl Ivakhov, Ivan Lytvynchuk and Petro Oliynyk.

Ethnic violence was exacerbated with the circulation of posters and leaflets inciting the Ukrainian population to murder Poles and "Judeo-Muscovites" alike.

Taras Bulba-Borovets, the founder of the UPA, criticized the attacks as soon as they began: 

According to prosecutor Piotr Zając, the Polish Institute of National Remembrance in 2003 considered three different versions of the events in its investigation:
 The Ukrainians at first planned to chase the Poles out, but events got out of hand over time.
 The decision to exterminate the Poles came directly from the OUN-UPA headquarters.
 The decision to exterminate the Poles can be attributed to some of the leaders of the OUN-UPA in the course of an internal conflict in the organisation.

The IPN concluded that the second version to be the most likely.

In October 1943 the OUN issued a communication (in Ukrainian only) that condemned the "mutual mass murders" of Ukrainians and Poles.

Reconciliation
The question of official acknowledgment of the ethnic cleansing remains a matter of discussion between Polish and Ukrainian historians and political leaders. Efforts are ongoing to bring about reconciliation between Poles and Ukrainians regarding the events. The Polish side has made steps towards reconciliation; in 2002 President Aleksander Kwaśniewski expressed regret over the resettlement program, known as Operation Vistula: "The infamous Operation Vistula is a symbol of the abominable deeds perpetrated by the communist authorities against Polish citizens of Ukrainian origin." He stated that the argument that "Operation Vistula was the revenge for the slaughter of Poles by the Ukrainian Insurgent Army" in 1943–1944 to be "fallacious and ethically inadmissible" by invoking "the principle of collective guilt." The Ukrainian government has not yet issued an apology. On 11 July 2003, Presidents Aleksander Kwaśniewski and Leonid Kuchma attended a ceremony held in the Volhynian village of Pavlivka (previously known as Poryck), where they unveiled a monument to the reconciliation. The Polish president said that it is unjust to blame the entire Ukrainian nation for these acts of terror: "The Ukrainian nation cannot be blamed for the massacre perpetrated on the Polish population. There are no nations that are guilty.... It is always specific people who bear the responsibility for crimes". In 2017, Ukrainian politicians banned the exhumation of the remains of Polish victims in Ukraine killed by the UPA in revenge for Polish demolition of the illegal UPA monument in the village of Hruszowice.  In 2018, Polish President Andrzej Duda refused to participate in a joint ceremony commemorating the 75th anniversary of the massacres with the Ukrainian President Petro Poroshenko and instead travelled to Lutsk to hold a separate event.

Classification as genocide
Historian Per Anders Rudling states that the goal of the OUN-UPA was not the extermination of Poles but ethnic cleansing of the region to attain an ethnically homogeneous state. The goal was thus to prevent a repeat of 1918–20, when Poland crushed Ukrainian independence, as the Polish Home Army was attempting to restore the Polish Republic in its pre-1939 borders.

According to Ivan Katchanovski, the mass killings of Poles in Volhynia by the UPA cannot be classified as a genocide because there is no evidence that the UPA intended to annihilate entire or significant parts of the Polish nation, the UPA action was mostly limited to a relatively small area and the number of Poles killed was quite a small fraction of the prewar Polish population in both the territories in which the UPA operated and of the entire Polish population in Poland and Ukraine.

Historian Antony Polonsky, who is an expert on the Holocaust and Polish Jewish history, writes that the "[massacres'] goal was not so much genocide as it was to force the local Polish population to leave."

Grzegorz Rossoliński-Liebe, who wrote a scholarly biography of Bandera, argues that the killings were ethnic cleansing rather than genocide. Rossoliński-Liebe sees "genocide", in this context, as a word that is sometimes used in political attacks on Ukraine. According to Jared McBride, writing in Slavic Review in 2016, there is a "scholarly consensus that this was a case of ethnic cleansing as opposed to genocide".

Polish view

Historian Grzegorz Motyka, an expert on Polish-Ukrainian issues, argues that "although the anti-Polish action was an ethnic cleansing, it also meets the definition of genocide". The Institute of National Remembrance investigated the crimes committed by the UPA against the Poles in Volhynia, Galicia and prewar Lublin Voivodeship and collected over 10,000 pages of documents and protocols. The massacres were described by the commission's prosecutor, Piotr Zając, as bearing the characteristics of a genocide: "there is no doubt that the crimes committed against the people of Polish nationality have the character of genocide". Also, the Institute of National Remembrance in a published paper stated:

The Volhynian massacres have all the traits of genocide listed in the 1948 UN Convention on the Prevention and Punishment of the Crime of Genocide, which defines genocide as an act "committed with intent to destroy, in whole or in part, a national, ethnical, racial or religious group, as such."

On 15 July 2009, the Sejm of the Republic of Poland unanimously adopted a resolution regarding "the tragic fate of Poles in Eastern Borderlands". The text of the resolution states that July 2009 marks the 66th anniversary "of the beginning of anti-Polish actions by the Organization of Ukrainian nationalists and the Ukrainian Insurgent Army on Polish Eastern territories – mass murders characterised by ethnic cleansing with marks of genocide". On 8 July 2016, the Sejm passed a resolution declaring 11 July a National Day of Remembrance of the victims of the Genocide of the Citizens of the Polish Republic committed by Ukrainian Nationalists and formally called the massacres a genocide.

A number of Polish scholars have labeled the Volhynia massacres worse than Nazi or Soviet atrocities in terms of their brutality, though not in scale, as so many of the victims were tortured and mutilated. Some have used the word "Zagłada", originally applied to the Final Solution, to describe the massacres.

Ukrainian view
In Ukraine, the events are called "Volhynia tragedy". Coverage in textbooks may be brief and/or euphemistic. Some Ukrainian historians accept the genocide classification, but argue that it was a "bilateral genocide" and that the Home Army was responsible for crimes against Ukrainian civilians that were equivalent in nature.

Many Ukrainians perceived the 2016 resolution as an "anti-Ukrainian gesture" in the context of Vladimir Putin's attempts to use the Volhynia issue to divide Poland and Ukraine in the context of the Russian–Ukrainian war. In September 2016, the Verkhovna Rada passed a resolution condemning "the one-sided political assessment of the historical events" in Poland. According to Ukrainian historian Andrii Portnov, the classification as genocide has been strongly supported by Poles who were expelled from the east and by parts of the Polish right-wing politics.

In popular culture
In 2009, a Polish historical documentary film Było sobie miasteczko... was produced by Adam Kruk for Telewizja Polska which tells the story of the Kisielin massacre.

The massacre of Poles in Volhynia was depicted in the 2016 movie Volhynia, which was directed by the Polish screenwriter and film director Wojciech Smarzowski.

See also

 Historiography of the Massacre of Poles in Volhynia
 27th Polish Home Army Infantry Division
 Janowa Dolina massacre
 Operation Vistula
 Poryck Massacre
 Przebraże Defence
 Koliyivschyna
 Massacre of Ostrówki
 Marianna Dolińska
 List of massacres in Ukraine
 Kisielin massacre
 Bloody Sunday on Volhynia
 Korosciatyn massacre
 Parośla I massacre
 Huta Pieniacka massacre
 Pidkamin massacre
 Palikrowy massacre
 Baligród massacre
 Massacre of Wola Ostrowiecka
 Muczne massacre
 Wiązownica massacre
 Chrynów massacre
 Gurów massacre
 Dominopol massacre
 Wiśniowiec massacres
 Gaj massacres
 Hurby massacre
 Głęboczyca massacre
 Zagaje massacre
 Budy Ossowskie massacre
 Chodaczków Wielki massacre

Notes

References 

  
Norman Davies, No Simple Victory: World War Two in Europe, page 352, Viking Penguin 2007. 

 L.Melnik, B.Yurochko, "Rozkhytane derevo myfiv" in The Lviv Newspaper, May 25, 2007.

Filip Ożarowski Wolyn Aflame, Publishing House WICI, 1977, .
Tadeusz Piotrowski: Genocide and Rescue in Wolyn: Recollections of the Ukrainian Nationalist Ethnic Cleansing Campaign Against the Poles During World War II, McFarland & Company, 2000, .
Wiktor Poliszczuk "Bitter truth": The criminality of the Organization of Ukrainian Nationalists (OUN) and the Ukrainian Insurgent Army (UPA), the testimony of a Ukrainian, 

Mikolaj Teres: Ethnic Cleansing of Poles in Volhynia and Eastern Galicia, Alliance of the Polish Eastern Provinces, 1993, .

Further reading
 Timothy Snyder. (2003).  The Causes of Ukrainian-Polish Ethnic Cleansing 1943, The Past and Present Society: Oxford University Press.

External links 

 Volhynia massacre. Truth and Remembrance — Institute of National Remembrance
 The Polish Institute of National Membrance, Ewa Siemaszko, Balance of the crime
 Pictures from massacres. Association Commemorating Victims of the Crime of Ukrainian nationalists
 Volhynia and Eastern Galicia 1943–1944. Documents of State Committee on Archives of Ukraine
 Tragedy of Volhynia 1943–1944. Documents of State Committee on Archives of Ukraine
 Kost Bondarenko, "The Volyn Tragedy: Echoes Through Decades" in Zerkalo Nedeli (the Mirror Weekly), February 15–21, 2003.
 Volyn Discussion (a list of articles)
 a Polish website of Światowy Związek Żołnierzy Armii Krajowej
An abbreviated preface to the monographic book of Władysław Siemaszko and Ewa Siemaszko, November 2000.

1943 in Poland
1944 in Poland
1943 in Ukraine
1944 in Ukraine
Mass murder in 1943
Mass murder in 1944
Mass murder in 1945
Massacres in 1943
Massacres in 1944
Massacres in 1945
 
 
Poles In Volhynia
Genocides in Europe
World War II crimes in Poland
Ukraine in World War II
Anti-Catholicism in Poland
Anti-Catholicism in the Soviet Union
Anti-Polish sentiment in Europe
Poles in Eastern Galicia
Poles in Eastern Galicia
Organization of Ukrainian Nationalists
Reichskommissariat Ukraine
Ukrainian Insurgent Army
Poland–Ukraine relations
War crimes in Ukraine
Victims of the Organization of Ukrainian Nationalists
Wartime sexual violence in World War II